This is a list of properties and districts in Gordon County, Georgia that are listed on the National Register of Historic Places (NRHP).

Current listings

|}

References

Gordon
Buildings and structures in Gordon County, Georgia